Nataliya Sviridova-Kalinovskaya (born 6 May 1977) is a Belarusian cross-country skier. She competed in three events at the 2002 Winter Olympics.

References

External links
 

1977 births
Living people
Belarusian female cross-country skiers
Olympic cross-country skiers of Belarus
Cross-country skiers at the 2002 Winter Olympics
People from Mogilev
Sportspeople from Mogilev Region